Deppe is a surname. Notable persons with that name include:

 Dale Deppe, American horticulturalist
 Ferdinand Deppe (1794–1861), German naturalist, explorer and painter
 Hans Deppe (1897–1969), German actor and film director
 Jaro Deppe (born 1948), German footballer 
 Ludwig Deppe (1828–1890), German composer, conductor and piano teacher
 Paula Deppe (1886–1922), Bohemian-German painter, engraver and illustrator
 Royce Deppe (born 1965), South African tennis player
 Ted Deppe, American poet
 Ulrike Deppe (born 1953), German slalom canoeist 

German-language surnames